The 2000 NCAA Division III women's basketball tournament was the 19th annual tournament hosted by the NCAA to determine the national champion of Division III women's collegiate basketball in the United States.

Two-time defending champions Washington University in St. Louis defeated Southern Maine in the championship game, 79–33, to claim the Bears' third Division III national title, their third of four consecutive.

The championship rounds were hosted by Western Connecticut State University in Danbury, Connecticut.

Bracket

Final Four

All-tournament team
 Alia Fischer, Washington University in St. Louis
 Tasha Rodgers, Washington University in St. Louis
 Trish Ripton, Southern Maine
 Jennifer Ulstad, St. Thomas (MN)
 Kelly Halpin, Scranton

See also
 2000 NCAA Division I women's basketball tournament
 2000 NCAA Division II women's basketball tournament
 2000 NAIA Division I women's basketball tournament
 2000 NAIA Division II women's basketball tournament
 2000 NCAA Division III men's basketball tournament

References

 
NCAA Division III women's basketball tournament
2000 in sports in Connecticut
Washington University Bears
Southern Maine Huskies